Aleksander Kropiwnicki (born 3 January 1962, Warsaw) is a Polish journalist, editor and diplomat who served an ambassador of Poland to Ethiopia (2017–2020).

Life 
Aleksander Kropiwnicki has finished Polish studies at the University of Warsaw. Between 1987 and 2001 he worked as a reporter and columnist in several newspapers, e.g. Tygodnik Solidarność. In 1993, as a fellow of the Alfred Friendly Press Fellowships, he spent six months in The Detroit News. Between 1997 and 2001 he was chief editor of the Polski Kalendarz Europejski (Polish European Calendar) monthly.

He was a member of Władysław Bartoszewski cabinet. In 2001 he started his diplomatic career at the embassy in London as a press counsellor. In 2006 he was head of one of the sections of the Polish Radio in Warsaw. In 2008 he began working for the Ministry of Foreign Affairs as a deputy director and, later, as a department director. Between 2011 and 2014 he was at the embassy in Nairobi, running it also as chargé d’Affaires. In July 2017, he was appointed Poland Ambassador to Ethiopia. He has also been accredited to Djibouti, South Sudan and the African Union. He is responsible for relations with IGAD and UNECA, as well. He finished his term on 31 July 2020.

Works 

 Błyskawiczny kurs Savoir-Vivre'u [with Katarzyna Kropiwnicka], Publicat, 2007, .
 Zajezdnia Londyn, Warszawa, Bydgoszcz: Oficyna Wydawnicza Branta, 2007, .
 Czarny wulkan, Warszawa: Rytm, 1993, .

References 

1962 births
Ambassadors of Poland to Ethiopia
Living people
Journalists from Warsaw
Polish editors
Diplomats from Warsaw
University of Warsaw alumni